The elegant tit (Pardaliparus elegans) is a species of bird in the tit family Paridae endemic to the Philippines.

Taxonomy
The species was formerly included in the much larger genus Parus but was moved to Pardaliparus with the yellow-bellied tit and the Palawan tit when Parus was split into several resurrected genera following the publication of a detailed molecular phylogenetic analysis in 2013.

Description
Small, sexes similar, with 9 races differing by shading and the amount and location of the white or yellow spotting in the wings and black; male top of head, throat, and upper breast glossy blue black; nape black with yellow spot; mantle black with white spots; lower back yellowish grey; tail black feathers edged white on basal 1/2 and second; primaries edged white; face, lower breast, and belly yellow. female is duller. imm resembles ad; has yellowish  throat and blackish moustachial streaks. Bill black sometimes with gray at base in ad, yellowish to yellow orange with top and bottom horn in inn; eye dark brown; legs gray.

Distribution and habitat 
It is endemic to the Philippines, ranging across most of the islands. Its natural habitats are subtropical or tropical moist lowland forest and subtropical or tropical moist montane forest.

References

 BirdLife International 2004.  Parus elegans.   2006 IUCN Red List of Threatened Species.   Downloaded on 26 July 2007.
 Gosler, A. & P. Clement (2007) "Family Paridae (Tits and Chickadees)" pp. 662-709.  in del Hoyo, J.; Elliot, A. & Christie D. (editors). (2007). Handbook of the Birds of the World. Volume 12: Picathartes to Tits and Chickadees. Lynx Editions. 
 A Guide to the Birds of the Philippines (2000). Robert S. Kennedy, Pedro C. Gonzales, Edward C. Dickinson, Hector C. Miranda, Jr., and Timothy H. Fisher

elegant tit
Endemic birds of the Philippines
elegant tit
Taxonomy articles created by Polbot